Susanna Kurzthaler (born 16 May 1995) is an Austrian biathlete. She was born in Innsbruck. She won a gold medal at the Biathlon Junior World Championships 2016, and represented Austria at the Biathlon World Championships 2016.

References

1995 births
Living people
Austrian female biathletes
Sportspeople from Innsbruck